Face to Face or Face 2 Face may refer to:

Films
Face to Face (1914 film), an American silent short film starring Miriam Nesbitt
Face to Face (1922 film), an American silent mystery film starring Marguerite Marsh
Face to Face (1952 film), an American two-part film
Face to Face (1963 film) (Licem u Lice), a Croatian film
Face to Face (1967 film) (Faccia a faccia), an Italian spaghetti western
Face to Face (1976 film) (Ansikte mot ansikte), a Swedish film by Ingmar Bergman
Face to Face (1979 film) (Ballë për Ballë), an Albanian drama
Face to Face (1984 film) (Mukhamukham), a Malayalam film
Face to Face (1990 film), a TV film presented by the Hallmark Hall of Fame
Face to Face, a 2001 American film featuring Meat Loaf
Face to Face (2011 film), an independent Australian film directed by Michael Rymer
Face 2 Face (2012 Malayalam film), a mystery film starring Mammootty
Face 2 Face (2012 American film), a documentary-styled film directed by Katherine Brooks
Face 2 Face (2016 film), an American film starring Daniela Bobadilla
Face to Face (2019 Sri Lankan film), an action thriller film by Harsha Udakanda
Face 2 Face (2019 Indian film), a romantic thriller film by Sandeep Sanardhan

Literature
Face to Face (Kulin novel), a novel by Ayşe Kulin
Face to Face (play), a 2000 play by David Williamson
Face to Face, a novel by Ellery Queen
Face to Face, a novel by Hall Bartlett
Face to Face, a 1949 short story collection by Nadine Gordimer
Face to Face, a novel by Robert Grant
"Face to Face", a 1980s Sunday Times (South Africa) column by Jani Allan
Face to Face: Polar Portraits, a photography and exploration book by Huw Lewis-Jones

Music

Groups
Face to Face (new wave band), a 1980s band from Boston
Face to Face (punk band), a band from California

Albums
Face to Face (The Angels album), 1978
Face to Face (Baby Face Willette album), 1961
Face to Face (Barclay James Harvest album), 1987
Face to Face (Cissy Houston album), 1996
Face to Face (Evelyn King album), 1983
Face to Face (1984 Face to Face album)
Face to Face (1996 Face to Face album)
Face to Face (GQ album), 1981
Face to Face (The Kinks album), 1966
Face to Face (Oscar Peterson and Freddie Hubbard album), 1982
Face to Face (Tete Montoliu and Niels-Henning Ørsted Pedersen album), 1982
Face to Face (Trevor Rabin album), 1979
Face to Face (Westlife album), 2005
Face to Face: A Live Recording, by Steve Harley & Cockney Rebel, 1977
Face 2 Face (2face Idibia album), 2004
Face 2 Face (EP), by Cassidy, 2010
Face2Face (Babyface album), 2001
Twin Fantasy (Face to Face), Car Seat Headrest, 2018
Face to Face, by 999, 1985
Face to Face, by Bob Kilpatrick, 2000
Face to Face, by Bounty Killer, 1994
Face to Face, by Chemistry, 2008
Face to Face, by The Dells, 1979
Face to Face, by Frank Duval, 1982
Face to Face, by Gary Burton and Makoto Ozone, 1995
Face to Face, by Jagjit Singh, 1994
Face to Face, by John Lee Hooker, 2004
Face to Face, by Kevin Eubanks, 1986
Face to Face, by Klinik, 1989
Face to Face, by Richard Galliano and Eddy Louiss, 2001
Face to Face, by Rick Derringer, 1980
Face to Face, by Tiger Okoshi, 1989
Face to Face, by Wayman Tisdale, 2001
Face 2 Face, by Refugees of Rap, 2010

Songs
"Face to Face" (Alabama song), 1987
"Face to Face" (Barry Gibb and Olivia Newton-John song), 1984
"Face to Face" (Daft Punk song), 2003
"Face to Face" (Gary Barlow song), 2014
"Face to Face" (Goodbye Mr. Mackenzie song), 1987
"Face 2 Face" (Juice Wrld song), 2022
"Face to Face" (KAT-TUN song), 2013
"Face to Face" (Ruel song), 2019
"Face to Face" (Sevendust song), 2004
"Face to Face" (Siouxsie and the Banshees song), 1992
"Face to Face", by 2 Unlimited from Real Things, 1994
"Face to Face", by Loudness from Lightning Strikes, 1986
"Face to Face", by Quiet Riot from Quiet Riot II, 1978
"Face to Face", by Rex Orange County from Pony, 2019
"Face to Face", by Yes from The Ladder, 1999
"Face to Face", by the Vels from House of Miracles

Television
Face to Face (Australian TV program), a 1990s Australian political talk program
Face to Face (British TV programme), a 1959–1962 British interview programme, revived 1989–1998
Face to Face (Hong Kong TV series), a 1999 Hong Kong series on TVB featuring Cindy Au
Face to Face (game show), a 1946–1947 American game show that aired on NBC
Face to Face (talk show), a 2010 Philippine talk show program
"Face to Face", an episode of I Love Lucy

Other uses
Face-to-face, also known as Face-me-I-face-you, a type of residential real estate, where a group of one-room apartments have their entrances facing each other.
 Face to Face (photograph), a photograph of two warriors staring each other down during the Oka Crisis
Face-to-face (philosophy), a philosophical concept described by Emmanuel Lévinas based on the idea that people are responsible to one-another in their face-to-face encounters
Face-to-face interaction, a concept in sociology, linguistics and communication studies involving social interaction carried out without any mediating technology
face2face (software), a software application to help mobile users identify when members of their social networks are nearby within walking distance
Face to Face, in Christianity, a type of three-day movement

See also
F2F (disambiguation)
Face à face, a French political TV talk program
"Face the Face", a song by Pete Townshend from the album White City: A Novel
Face time, interaction between two or more people at the same time and place
Friend-to-friend, a type of peer-to-peer computer network
Tête à Tête (disambiguation)